Nureyev (1977–2001) was an American-bred, French-trained Thoroughbred racehorse and champion sire. As a racehorse, he was best known as the disqualified "winner" of the 2000 Guineas in 1980.

Background
Nureyev was a bay horse with a white blaze and white sock on his right hind leg bred in Kentucky by the Claiborne Farm. He was sired by Northern Dancer out of the mare Special, making him a half brother of to several winners including Fairy Bridge, the dam of Sadler's Wells. He was bought in 1978 at the Keeneland yearling sale by Stavros Niarchos for US$1.3 million ($ million inflation adjusted), at the time the second-highest paid price ever paid for a yearling—behind only Canadian Bound. Niarchos named the colt in honor of the famous ballet dancer, Rudolf Nureyev. Niarchos sent the colt to race in Europe where he was trained by François Boutin.

Racing career
In November 1979, Nureyev made his two-year-old racing debut in France. He easily outdistanced the field in the Prix Thomas Bryon at Saint-Cloud Racecourse, winning by six lengths.

The following spring of 1980, he won the Prix Djebel at Maisons-Laffitte Racecourse in his 3-year-old debut. He was then shipped to Newmarket Racecourse in the United Kingdom for the 2000 Guineas. His rider, Philippe Paquet, restrained Nureyev in the early stages before pushing his way through the field (interfering with several other runners) to make his challenge in the final quarter mile. He got the better of a brief struggle with Known Fact to win by a neck with Posse, the main sufferer in the earlier interference, finishing strongly to take third. After a lengthy inquiry, the result overturned by the racing stewards, who awarded the race to Known Fact and relegated Nureyev to last place. It was the first time that a winner of the 2,000 Guineas Classic had been disqualified. Nureyev was scheduled to compete in June's Epsom Derby, but came down with a virus and never raced again.

Stud record
Nureyev was sent to stand at stud at his owner's Haras de Fresnay-le-Buffard in Neuvy-au-Houlme in Lower Normandy. Renowned French horseman Alec Head recommended Nureyev to Lexington, Kentucky breeder John T. L. Jones Jr. and in mid-1981 put together a syndicate that purchased Nureyev for US$14 million. Nureyev was brought to Jones' Walmac-Warnerton Farm partnership near Lexington and then under Jones' wholly owned Walmac International.

On May 5, 1987, Nureyev suffered a life-threatening fracture to his right hind leg in a paddock accident during breeding season, but veterinary surgeons were able to save his life.

During his breeding career, Nureyev sired 135 stakes winners and more than twenty champions, despite fertility problems. In 1998, Sheikh Mohammed bin Rashid Al Maktoum set a European sales record when he paid three million guineas (about $5.4 million) for yearling colt Abshurr by Nureyev at the Newmarket sales.

Nureyev died at the age of 24 on October 29, 2001. He is buried at Walmac International in Lexington, Kentucky.

Major winners
c = colt, f = filly, g = gelding

Damsire
Nureyev is also the damsire of several top international horses, including:
Peteski – the 1993 Canadian Triple Crown champion
Bago – the 2004 European Champion 3-Yr-Old Colt
Spinning Queen – sold in November 2006 for three million guineas, becoming the most expensive filly ever sold at public auction in Europe 
Desert King – winner of the 1996 National Stakes, the 1997 Irish 2,000 Guineas and Irish Derby Stakes
Zabeel – won 1989 MRVC Stakes (1989), the 1990 Australian Guineas and Craiglee Stakes. Twice Champion Australian sire and four-time Champion New Zealand sire
Big Brown – 2008 Kentucky Derby winner and the 2008 Preakness Stakes winner
Manistique – California millionaire mare who won three Grade 1 races.

Pedigree

References

1977 racehorse births
2001 racehorse deaths
Racehorses bred in Kentucky
Racehorses trained in France
Thoroughbred family 5-h
Champion Thoroughbred Sires of France
British Champion Thoroughbred broodmare sires
Chefs-de-Race